Fall Creek Falls, is a three to four drop waterfall located on the North Umpqua River at the west skirt of the Umpqua National Forest, in Douglas County, in the U.S. state of Oregon. It is located in a privileged natural area where the river creates several waterfalls: Susan Creek Falls, Emile Falls, and Grotto Falls are two to five miles away.

Access 
Hiking to Fall Creek Falls starts at a trailhead that runs south along a cascading creek. The trailhead is at the left side of Oregon Route 138 as it goes through Umpqua National Forest, and is approximately one mile of gravel surface into the mountain. The trail passes through a narrow crevice in a large boulder, then climbs alongside the creek before approaching the falls.

See also 
 List of waterfalls in Oregon

References 

Waterfalls of Oregon
Parks in Douglas County, Oregon
Waterfalls of Douglas County, Oregon